Luisana mía is a Venezuelan telenovela made by RCTV in 1981, original by Ligia Lezama. It stars Mayra Alejandra and Jean Carlo Simancas and with the special participation of Herminia Martínez, Yanis Chimaras, Charles Barry and Virgilio Galindo. It had as its main theme Quizás sí, quizás no interpreted by Sabú.

Plot 
Luisana Narváez de Bernal (Mayra Alejandra) is a beautiful and intelligent woman, who refuses to live the rest of her life chained to a kitchen and being only a housewife, however her husband, Juan Miguel Bernal (Jean Carlo Simancas) he is an insecure sexist, who wants to have her almost like a slave, which makes their marriage hell. This is collapsing her family, but Luisana is persistent and will do everything possible to save her marriage and remove those sexist thoughts from her husband's mind so that he understands reality.

Cast 
 Mayra Alejandra as Luisana Narváez de Bernal  
 Jean Carlo Simancas as Juan Miguel Bernal
 América Barrios as Doña Carlota Andrade
 Zoe Ducós as Estela de Bernal
 Carlos Cámara Jr. as Gregory
 Víctor Cámara as Alfredo
 Herminia Martínez as Victoria Andrade
 Yanis Chimaras as Tomás Vidal
 Raquel Castaños as Corina Bernal
 Virgilio Galindo as Emilio Narváez 
 Carlos Márquez as Edmundo Bernal
 Scarlet Villalobos as Elita Bernal Narváez
 Virginia Urdaneta as Flor Narváez
 Dilia Waikarán as Rosina Iñigo 
 Yajaira Orta as Jenny González
 Nancy González as Clarisa Pacheco
 Javier Vidal Pradas as Henry Rodríguez
 Sixto Blanco as Lic. Manuel Villegas
 Enrique Benshimol as Don Eduardo Vidal
 María Teresa Acosta as Luisa de Narváez
 Agustina Martín as Esther de Narváez
 Charles Barry as Compadre Oliviero
 Cecilia Villarreal as Cecilia 
 Humberto García Brandt as Paúl
 Jenny Galván as Sandra
 Karla Luzbel as Irene
 Humberto Tancredi as Luciano
 Miguel Ángel Landa as Miguel 
 Fernando Ortega as Raúl
 Imperio Zanmataro as Sofía
 Lucy Bogado as Raiza
 Haydée Balza as Chela
 Soraya Zanz as Tata
 Hugo Martínez Clemente as Culin
 Rafael Vallenilla as Paquito
 Carlos Flores as Ñeño
 Lorenzo Henríquez as Bachaco
 Freddy Galavís as Periquito
 Miguel Alcántara as Doctor
 Evelyn Berroterán as Stewardess
 Ignacio Navarro as Lawyer
 Enrique Soto as Dr. Cáceres 
 Hazel Leal as Agency Model
 Cristina Reyes as Flight Attendant
 Carlos Villamizar as Chief of Personnel
 Axel Rodríguez as Juan Miguel's colleague
 Argenis Chirivela
 Omar Farías
 Aura Gutiérrez
 Oswaldo Gutiérrez
 María Machado
 Iselyn Martínez
 Otto Rodríguez
 Marisabel Vargas

References

External links

Opening Credits

1981 telenovelas
RCTV telenovelas
Venezuelan telenovelas
1981 Venezuelan television series debuts
1981 Venezuelan television series endings
Spanish-language telenovelas
Television shows set in Caracas